Shri Shikshayatan School is a prestigious all girls school in Kolkata, West Bengal, India.
It is affiliated to Central Board of Secondary Education.
Shri Shikshayatan school offers education  from pre-nursery up to class 12. The school has won the British Council International School Award numerous times and was declared as The Telegraph's School of The Year in 2018. The school branches out into The Shri Shikshayatan College, a NAAC A grade college affiliated to the University of Calcutta.
The school was declared "India's Most Dynamic School" by the jury of Education Today in 2022.

History
The school had its origin as Marwari Ballika Vidyalaya, started from  donations and leadership of Jugal Kishore Birla and Ghanshyam Das Birla, way back in 1920. At that time it was located in Burra Bazar area of old Calcutta.

In 1954, it shifted to its current located at 11, Lord Sinha Road, Kolkata 700071 and was rechristened as Shri Shikshayatan School.

The school has now grown into women's college, Shri Shikshayatan College, which was founded in 1955.
Shri Shikshayatan School was established, and is now administered and managed by the members of the linguistic minority through its parent body Shikshayatan foundation.

See also
Education in India
List of schools in India
Education in West Bengal

References

External links

Schools in Colonial India
High schools and secondary schools in West Bengal
Girls' schools in Kolkata
Educational institutions established in 1920
1920 establishments in India